Daniele Capelli (born 20 June 1986) is an Italian footballer who plays as a defender.

Career
Deemed surplus to requirements prior to the beginning of the 2009–10 season, Capelli was loaned to Serie B side Reggina. However, by January 2010, Atalanta were struggling near the bottom of the table and Capelli was promptly recalled. In July 2011 Capelli signed a new four-year contract.

On 28 August 2013, Capelli was signed by A.C. Cesena in a temporary deal. On 27 June 2014, the loan was extended.

On 30 June 2015, Capelli became a free agent. On 10 July 2015 Capelli signed a two-year contract with Cesena.

On 2 July 2018, he signed a two-year contract with Serie B club Padova.

References

External links
 Atalanta B.C. Official Player Profile
 Daniele Capelli National Team Stats at FIGC.it
 La Gazzetta dello Sport Player Profile
 AIC profile (data by football.it) 

Living people
1986 births
Sportspeople from the Province of Bergamo
Italian footballers
Association football defenders
Atalanta B.C. players
S.S. Arezzo players
Reggina 1914 players
A.C. Cesena players
Spezia Calcio players
Calcio Padova players
Serie A players
Serie B players
People from Calcinate
Footballers from Lombardy